Lisbeth Yanneri Bandrés Alvarado (born 24 March 1988) is a Venezuelan footballer who plays as a midfielder for Atlético SC. She was a member of the Venezuela women's national team.

International career
Bandrés played for Venezuela at senior level in three Copa América Femenina editions (2006, 2010 and 2018) and the 2010 Central American and Caribbean Games.

International goals
Scores and results list Venezuela's goal tally first

References

External links

1988 births
Living people
Women's association football midfielders
Venezuelan women's footballers
Sportspeople from Valencia, Venezuela
Venezuela women's international footballers
Central American and Caribbean Games gold medalists for Venezuela
Competitors at the 2010 Central American and Caribbean Games
Caracas F.C. (women) players
Alianza Petrolera players
Venezuelan expatriate women's footballers
Venezuelan expatriate sportspeople in Colombia
Expatriate women's footballers in Colombia
Central American and Caribbean Games medalists in football